The Strong Breed is one of the best known plays by Wole Soyinka. It is a tragedy that ends with an individual sacrifice for the sake of the communal benefit. The play is centered on the tradition of egungun, a Yoruba festival tradition in which a scapegoat of the village carries out the evil of the community and is exiled from the civilization. Eman, the play's protagonist, takes on the role of "carrier", knowing it will result in beating and exile. He does this to spare a young simpleton the same fate. The ritual takes an unexpected turn as Eman flees. His pursuers set a trap for him that results in his death.

The play was first published in London in 1964 by Oxford University Press, and subsequently by Rex Collings in 1971.

Plays by Wole Soyinka
Tragedy plays
Plays set in Africa
Yoruba culture
Nigerian plays
Oxford University Press books